Tonna oentoengi is a species of large sea snail, a marine gastropod mollusk in the family Tonnidae, the tun shells.

Description
The length of the shell attains 110 mm.

Distribution
This marine species occurs in the Arafura Sea.

References

 Vos, C. (2005b) A new species of Tonna Brünnich, 1772 (Gastropoda, Tonnidae) (Tonna oentoengi) from Indonesian and Western Australian waters. Gloria Maris 44(1-2): 18-24
 Vos, C. (2007) A conchological Iconography (No. 13) - The family Tonnidae. 123 pp., 30 numb. plus 41 (1 col.) un-numb. text-figs, 33 maps., 63 col. pls, Conchbooks, Germany

External links

Tonnidae
Gastropods described in 2005